Regardie's (1980–1992) was a Washington, D.C. business magazine that was published from 1980 through 1992.  It was distinguished by its quirky nature, but was also able to boast about breaking a number of significant financial stories such as a 1990 story on First American Bank and the Bank of Credit and Commerce International.

History

In 1973, William A. Regardie and his wife Renay Nadler used $5,000 to start a real estate research publication called Housing Data Reports.  By 1975 they also began publishing a New Homes Guide for house listings.  In 1979 they started a publication called Real Estate Washington.  This was re-vamped by Regardie, in partnership with Randy Bartow and Michael A. DeSimone, to become Regardie's: The Business of Washington in 1980.

Popular features in Regardie's included a list of the top 100 richest people in Washington, and the "Capital Offenses" column that ran down scandals of the year.

The magazine's revenue was largely dependent on advertising.  At its height, issues often reached 300 pages.  By 1991, it was publishing 50,000 copies of each issue, but 38,000 were being distributed for free, and issues had been reduced to around 100 pages.  A drop in ad revenue also caused the magazine to move from monthly publication to bi-monthly in February 1991.  Regardie asked free subscribers to pay, remarking in his trademark irreverent fashion, "if you want to keep Regardie's in business, either subscribe to Regardie's today, or I'm going to mothball this sucker."  The plea was unsuccessful, however, and Regardie announced he was shutting down the magazine in December 1992.

People
Brian Kelly, who would become editor of U.S. News & World Report in 2007, was editor of the magazine from 1985 to 1992.

Richard Blow worked at the magazine in the 1980s, and served as editor-in-chief for the 1994-95 version of the magazine.

Resurrections

Regardie resurrected the magazine in a black-and-white format, again in bi-monthly form and edited by Richard Blow, in 1994, but it shut down again in 1995.

In September 1999, after selling their other publications, Regardie and Nadler started Regardie's Power, which lasted for 18 months, ending with its March/April 2001 issue.

References

Bimonthly magazines published in the United States
Business magazines published in the United States
Monthly magazines published in the United States
Defunct magazines published in the United States
Magazines established in 1980
Magazines disestablished in 1992
Magazines published in Washington, D.C.